Jim Kelly is an author and journalist. Kelly won the Crime Writers Association Dagger in the Library award in 2006.

As of 2016, Kelly has written fourteen crime novels. His first series began with The Water Clock, featuring fictional journalist Philip Dryden, based in the Cambridgeshire area of Great Britain. Kelly won the CWA Dagger in the Library Award in 2006 for the Dryden books. His new series, based on Detective Inspector Peter Shaw, is based on the North Norfolk coast and in the port of Lynn. In 2010 Kelly won the New Angle prize for literature for Death Watch, the second in the Shaw and Valentine series.

He is married to the biographer Midge Gillies and they have a daughter together.

Bibliography

Philip Dryden Series

The Water Clock 2003
The Fire Baby 2005
The Moon Tunnel 2005
The Coldest Blood 2006
The Skeleton Man 2007
Nightrise 2012
The Funeral Owl 2013

DI Peter Shaw

Death Wore White 2008
Death Watch 2010
Death Toll 2011
 Death's Door 2012
At Death's Window 2014
Death on Demand 2015
Death Ship 2016

Nighthawk

The Great Darkness 2018
The Mathematical Bridge 2019
The Night Raids 2020

References

External links
Jim Kelly's web site

1957 births
Living people
People from the London Borough of Barnet
British crime fiction writers
British male journalists
British male novelists